Hypercompe permaculata, the many-spotted tiger moth, is a tiger moth of the family Erebidae. It was first described by Alpheus Spring Packard in 1872. It is native to the western United States and parts of northern Mexico.

References

Hypercompe
Moths of North America
Taxa named by Alpheus Spring Packard
Moths described in 1872